Oleksandr Valeryiovich Savytskyi (born 3 May 1971), is a Ukrainian retired professional ice hockey player and coach. He played for multiple teams during a career that lasted from 1988 until 2008. He also played internationally for the Ukrainian national team at several World Championships, and later served as the head coach of the national team, as well as HK Kremenchuk of the Ukrainian Hockey League.

References

External links
 

1971 births
Living people
AaB Ishockey players
Ak Bars Kazan players
HC CSKA Moscow players
HC Khimik Voskresensk players
HC Plzeň players
HKM Zvolen players
IF Björklöven players
Keramin Minsk players
ShVSM Kyiv players
Sokil Kyiv players
Soviet ice hockey defencemen
Sportspeople from Kyiv
Ukraine men's national ice hockey team coaches
Ukrainian ice hockey coaches
Ukrainian ice hockey defencemen
Ukrainian expatriate sportspeople in the Czech Republic
Ukrainian expatriate sportspeople in Slovakia
Ukrainian expatriate sportspeople in Russia
Ukrainian expatriate sportspeople in Germany
Ukrainian expatriate sportspeople in Denmark
Ukrainian expatriate sportspeople in Sweden
Ukrainian expatriate sportspeople in Belarus
Expatriate ice hockey players in the Czech Republic
Expatriate ice hockey players in Slovakia
Expatriate ice hockey players in Russia
Expatriate ice hockey players in Germany
Expatriate ice hockey players in Denmark
Expatriate ice hockey players in Sweden
Expatriate ice hockey players in Belarus
Ukrainian expatriate ice hockey people